Juan Roberto Diago Durruthy "Diago" (born 1971 in Havana) is a Cuban contemporary artist who graduated at the Escuela Nacional de Bellas Artes "San Alejandro," Havana. Grandson of artist Roberto Juan Diago Querol, his grandmother was a First Violinist in the Havana Symphony Orchestra. Born in an intellectual background, he nevertheless lived his childhood in a poor neighborhood, el barrio Pogolotti.

Influenced by his own past, in his work he confronts the Cuban official racial narrative, rewriting history to include the slavery and shame the country has tried to forget, working with material like calico in reference to what slaves used to wear.

== Exhibitions ==

 1997 Venice Biennale, Venice, Italy.
 1998 Galería La Acacia, Roberto Diago: Cuestiones, San Jose, La Habana, Cuba.
 1999 Galerie Etats D'Art, L'avant-garde Cubaine à Paris, November 19 to December 11, Paris, France, (Prix Amédée Maratier).
 1999 International Contemporary Art Fair (FIAC), Paris, France.
 2000 Cernuda Arte, Calentando Motores / Heating up the Engines, group exhibition, Coral Gables, FL, USA.
 2001 Cernuda Arte, Mi historia es tu historia / My history is your history, June - July, Coral Gables, FL, USA.
 2001 Cernuda Arte, Veinticinco Artistas Cubanos de Aquí y de Allá, de Ayer y de Hoy, group exhibition Coral Gables, FL, USA.
 2002 Yaco Garcia Arte Latino Americano, Galería Arteconsult, Juan Roberto Diago: Obras Recientes, March, 2002, Panama City, Panamá.
 2002 Museo Nacional De Bellas Artes, Comiendo Cuchillo: Exposición de Juan Roberto Diago, June 6 to July 10, La Habana, Cuba.
 2005 Pan American Art Gallery, Dallas, Texas, USA.
 2006 Galería (e)spacio. Madrid, Spain.
 2008 Galería El Torco. Cantabria, Spain
 2010-12 Queloides: Race and Racism in Cuban Contemporary Art, Havana-Pittsburgh-New York City-Cambridge, MA, USA.
 2013 Drapetomania: Grupo Antillano and the Art of Afro-Cuba, (Harvard University, Cambridge, MA; Museum of the African Diaspora, San Francisco, CA; 8th Floor Gallery, New York, NY, USA.)
 2013 Centro de Arte Contemporáneo Wifredo Lam, La Habana, Cuba.
 2014 Galería de la Biblioteca Pública Rubén Martínez Villena, La Habana, Cuba.
 2014 Galería Tristá, Sobre mis pasos, Trinidad, Cuba.
 2015 Panamerican Art Projects / Galerie Crone, Tracing Ashes, Berlin, Germany; Miami, FL, USA.
 2016 Magnan Metz Gallery, Sobre mis pasos (Sur mes pas), New York, NY, USA.
 2016 Vallois Galerie, Paris, France.
 2017 Ethelbert Cooper Gallery of African American Art, Diago: The Pasts Of This Afro-Cuban Present, Harvard, February 2 to May 5, Cambridge, MA, USA.
 2017 Venice Biennale, Cuban Pavilion, La Habana, Cuba.
 2018 The Halsey Institute of Contemporary Art, Charleston, SC, USA.
 2018 Kennedy Center installation (Artes de Cuba), Washington, D.C., USA.
 2019 Lowe Museum at University of Miami, Diago: The Pasts of this Afro-Cuban Present, October 24 to January 19, 2020, Miami, FL, USA.

Awards

 1995: “Juan Francisco Elso” Prize (Académie des Beaux-Arts de Cuba)
 1999: “ Amédée Maratier” Award (Fondation Kikoïne, Paris)
 2000: “Abril 2000” Prize (UJC Nacional)

References

External links /

 http://www.mariposa-arts.net/Artist.asp?ArtistID=41021&Akey=TJMS9E5St
 http://www.cubanartcollection.com/Artist.asp?ArtistID=24931&Akey=8V568XFL

Cuban painters
Living people
1971 births
Cuban contemporary artists
Academia Nacional de Bellas Artes San Alejandro alumni